Nguyễn Thị Hồng Bích (born 27 July 1963) is a Vietnamese backstroke swimmer. She competed in two events at the 1980 Summer Olympics.

References

External links
 

1963 births
Living people
Vietnamese female backstroke swimmers
Olympic swimmers of Vietnam
Swimmers at the 1980 Summer Olympics
Place of birth missing (living people)
21st-century Vietnamese women